Castalia Creek is a stream in the U.S. state of South Dakota.

History
Castalia Creek was indirectly named after Castalia, Iowa.

See also
List of rivers of South Dakota

References

Rivers of Charles Mix County, South Dakota
Rivers of South Dakota